is a Japanese anime series, created by Sunrise. Directed by Masakazu Obara and written by Hiroyuki Yoshino, it premiered in Japan on TV Tokyo from September 2004 to March 2005. The series focuses on the lives of HiMEs—girls with the capacity to materialize photons—gathered at Fuka Academy for secret purposes.

The series was licensed for North American distribution by Bandai Entertainment and European distribution by Bandai's European subsidiary, Beez, with the first American DVD released in March 2006. Bandai released the Complete Collection DVD set in America on October 7, 2008. It is also shown on iaTV in the mid-2000s and on Comcast’s Anime Selects on Demand for a limited time. At Otakon 2013, Funimation had announced that it acquired the series, along with a handful of other former BEI titles. They also announced at the 2017 New York Comic Con that they will release My-HiMe, My-Otome, and a My-Otome Zwei + My-Otome 0: S.ifr pack, all on Blu-Ray + DVD combo packs on January 8, 2018.

Plot

The story centers on Mai Tokiha, a seemingly ordinary high-school girl who has recently transferred to the prestigious Fuuka Academy with her younger brother, Takumi. The elite Fuuka Academy harbors a number of mysteries, involving both fellow students and staff. As they arrive at the Academy, Mai finds herself bound to a Child, a part-spiritual, part-mechanical creature, that can only be summoned and controlled by girls with the HiME mark.

Mai is told that she is one of twelve girls who have the aforementioned mark, and that they must use their powers to protect everyone from Orphans, monstrous creatures with abilities similar to the HiME's Children. Mai is very reluctant to become involved at first, because of her protective role towards her brother, but the other HiME quickly begin to manifest around her, each with very different motivations and goals for using (or not using) her powers. As the Orphans become more numerous and aggressive, Mai joins the other HiME's fight against them to protect those around her, including her friends, who are even drawn into the conflict as well. However, Mai and the other HiME soon find out the Orphans are not the only kind of enemy they have to fight, and as the cause of all of this is revealed, they find themselves facing the dark secret about their destiny.

Characters

The series features a group of students and staff at Fuuka Academy, with the emphasis on the female cast. Although most of them were introduced by the second episode, only a few characters are disclosed as HiMEs; the other characters' abilities and alignments are revealed throughout the rest of the series.

The main characters are the hardworking, caring Mai Tokiha, the catlike Mikoto Minagi, and the cold beauty Natsuki Kuga. Other ones are shown with a wide range of personalities and relationships. Obara stated that he "wanted to reverse the roles that men and women usually play," making the actresses take leading roles.

Mai is the protagonist of the series. She is portrayed as a self-reliant person, often hesitant to tell others about her problems. She is a first-year high school student, and her roommate is Mikoto Minagi. Her stated hobbies are working part-time jobs and taking care of Takumi.
Mikoto is a third-grade middle school student who behaves very much like a cat. She loves to be with Mai, often at her side or clinging to her. She also has a problem with spicy food, and consuming it will often send her into rampages while looking for water.
Natsuki is typically portrayed as a serious, rational blue-haired female. Though she does not work with Mikoto neither Mai, the three become friends as the series progresses.

Related media
A manga series was developed by Sunrise. It was first serialized in Akita Shoten's Shōnen Champion and later published in North America by TOKYOPOP. It follows an alternate storyline at Fuka Academy where Mai, Mikoto and Natsuki become roommates.

An anime spin-off, entitled , aired in Japan from October 2005 to March 2006. The series featured some of the same characters from the previous one, but it is set in a far future timeline.

A PlayStation 2 video game,  was developed by Marvelous Interactive and released in Japan on June 30, 2005. The adventure game follows a storyline different from the anime and manga series. A remake, Mai-Hime - Unmei no Keitouju Shura, was released for the PC.

A parody trailer for a Mai-Hime movie was included in the first DVD of Mai-Otome, with the title Fuuka Wars or The Great Battle of Fuuka with a release date of 20006[sic].

A second manga series titled  was developed by Sunrise. It was first serialized in Dengeki Daioh in 2010.

References

External links
  Official My-Hime website
  My-Hime website at TV Tokyo
 

 
2004 anime television series debuts
2010 anime OVAs
Anime composed by Yuki Kajiura
Anime with original screenplays
Bandai Entertainment anime titles
Bandai Namco franchises
Fiction about death games
Funimation
Magical girl anime and manga
My-HiME Project
Odex
Shōnen manga
Slice of life anime and manga
Sunrise (company)
Supernatural anime and manga
TV Tokyo original programming
Battle royale anime and manga